This article lists important figures and events in Malaysian public affairs during the year 1972, together with births and deaths of notable Malaysians.

Incumbent political figures

Federal level
Yang di-Pertuan Agong: Sultan Abdul Halim Muadzam Shah
Raja Permaisuri Agong: Sultanah Bahiyah
Prime Minister: Tun Abdul Razak
Deputy Prime Minister: Tun Dr Ismail
Lord President: Mohamed Azmi Mohamed

State level
 Sultan of Johor: Sultan Ismail
 Sultan of Kedah: Tengku Abdul Malik (Regent)
 Sultan of Kelantan: Sultan Yahya Petra (Deputy Yang di-Pertuan Agong)
 Raja of Perlis: Tuanku Syed Putra
 Sultan of Perak: Sultan Idris Shah II
 Sultan of Pahang: Sultan Abu Bakar
 Sultan of Selangor: Sultan Salahuddin Abdul Aziz Shah
 Sultan of Terengganu: Sultan Ismail Nasiruddin Shah
 Yang di-Pertuan Besar of Negeri Sembilan: Tuanku Jaafar
 Yang di-Pertua Negeri (Governor) of Penang: Tun Syed Sheikh Barabakh
 Yang di-Pertua Negeri (Governor) of Malacca: Tun Haji Abdul Aziz bin Abdul Majid
 Yang di-Pertua Negeri (Governor) of Sarawak: Tun Tuanku Bujang Tuanku Othman
 Yang di-Pertua Negeri (Governor) of Sabah: Tun Pengiran Ahmad Raffae

Events
 31 January – Pacific Area Tourist Association Conference was held in Kuala Lumpur.
 1 February – Kuala Lumpur was accorded city status. Tan Sri Dato' Lokman Yusof became the first Mayor of Kuala Lumpur (Datuk Bandar Kuala Lumpur).
 February – Queen Elizabeth II of the United Kingdom made her first official visit to Malaysia. She visited General Hospital at Kota Kinabalu. The hospital was then renamed in her honour (Hospital Queen Elizabeth). It is the only hospital in Malaysia named after her.        
 March – Lee Kuan Yew's first visit to Malaysia after Singapore's separation from Malaysia on August 9 1965.
 18 April – The Rajang Area Security Command (RASCOM) was established during the Sarawak Communist Insurgency.
 19 June – TV Pendidikan, Malaysia's first and only educational TV network was officially launched.
 2–11 August – Malaysia competed for the first time at the Summer Paralympics in Heidelberg, West Germany, with a team of four.
 13 September – About 27 people were killed in a river ferry disaster on Kerian River at the Perak-Kedah border.

Births
 18 January – Eja (Siti Shahrizah bt Saifuddin) – Malaysian model and actress
 26 February – Victor Wong – Malaysian Chinese singer
 10 July – Rosnah Shirlin, Malaysian politician
 27 July – Sheikh Muszaphar Shukor – first Malaysian angkasawan (Cosmonaut)
 28 November – Kazim Elias – Malaysian preacher and Islamic consultant

Deaths
 15 May – Tan Sri Dato' Lokman Yusof – first Lord Mayor (Datuk Bandar) of Kuala Lumpur,

See also 
 1972
 1971 in Malaysia | 1973 in Malaysia
 History of Malaysia

 
Years of the 20th century in Malaysia
Malaysia
Malaysia
1970s in Malaysia